Club Social y Deportivo Madryn (usually called simply Deportivo Madryn) is an Argentine sports club. Its home town is Puerto Madryn, in the Chubut Province. Although other sports are practised there, the club is mostly known for both its football and basketball teams.

Football
Deportivo Madryn currently plays in the regionalised 4th level of Argentine football league system, the Torneo Argentino B.

Basketball
The basketball squad plays in the regional Liga Patagónica de Básquetbol. Madryn played three seasons in the Liga Nacional de Básquetbol (first division), but sold its spot at the end of the 2006–07 season for economic reasons.

External links

Official website 

 
Madryn
Association football clubs established in 1924
Madryn
1924 establishments in Argentina
Basketball teams established in 1924